Masahiro Akimoto may refer to:

, Japanese former ski jumper
, Japanese former footballer